Gora Tall (born 20 May 1985, in Louga) is a Senegalese professional footballer who plays as a central defender for Kuwaiti club Al-Shabab SC (Al Ahmadi).

External links

1985 births
Living people
Senegalese footballers
Association football defenders
Israeli Premier League players
ASEC Ndiambour players
F.C. Ashdod players
Liga Portugal 2 players
Segunda Divisão players
C.D. Trofense players
Gondomar S.C. players
Cypriot First Division players
APOP Kinyras FC players
AEP Paphos FC players
Ethnikos Achna FC players
FC Steaua București players
FC Steaua II București players
Senegalese expatriate footballers
Expatriate footballers in Israel
Expatriate footballers in Portugal
Expatriate footballers in Cyprus
Expatriate footballers in Romania
Expatriate footballers in Kuwait
Senegalese expatriate sportspeople in Portugal
Senegalese expatriate sportspeople in Kuwait
Senegalese expatriate sportspeople in Romania
Senegalese expatriate sportspeople in Israel
Senegalese expatriate sportspeople in Cyprus
Kuwait Premier League players
Al-Shabab SC (Kuwait) players